C88 may refer to :

 Ruy Lopez chess openings ECO code
 Immunoproliferative disorders ICD-10 code
 Employment Service Convention, 1948 code
 Porsche C88 prototype car for the Chinese market, 1994
 Caldwell 88 (NGC 5823), an open cluster in the constellations Circinus and Lupus
 Form C88, a European Union customs declaration form 
 An early version of the programming language standard ANSI C

See also
 C8 (disambiguation)